Separates is the second album by English punk rock band 999, released in 1978. Separates was released in the United States under the title High Energy Plan, with a different cover and slightly altered track listing; on High Energy Plan, "Tulse Hill Night" and "Out of Reach" are replaced by "Waiting" and "Action".

Track listing
All tracks composed by Nick Cash and Guy Days; except where indicated

Side 1
 "Homicide" – 4:25
 "Tulse Hill Night" – 3:00
 "Rael Rean" – 3:24
 "Let's Face It" – 3:50
 "Crime (Parts 1 & 2)" (Andy Arthurs, Cash, Days, Pablo LaBritain, Jon Watson) – 4:31

Side 2
 "Feelin' Alright with the Crew" – 3:32
 "Out of Reach" (Cash, Watson) – 3:20
 "Subterfuge" – 2:31
 "Wolf" – 3:43
 "Brightest View" – 3:38
 "High Energy Plan" (Arthurs, Cash, Phil Chambon) – 2:49

2000 CD reissue bonus tracks
"You Can't Buy Me" – 2:44
"Soldier" – 2:56
"Waiting" – 3:01
"Action" – 3:03

Personnel
999
Nick Cash – guitar, vocals
Guy Days – guitar, vocals
Pablo LaBritain – drums
Jon Watson – bass

Technical
Martin Rushent – production
Alan Winstanley – engineering
Paul Henry - art direction, design
Toscani - photography

References

1978 albums
999 (band) albums
Albums produced by Martin Rushent
United Artists Records albums